Blackhand's Street Weapons 2020 is a supplement published by R. Talsorian Games in 1994 for the dystopian near-future role-playing game Cyberpunk.

Contents
Blackhand's Street Weapons 2020 is a compilation of over 250 weapons for Cyberpunk 2020.

Reception
In the August 1996 edition of Dragon (Issue #232), Rick Swan commented that "trigger-happy Cyberpunk-ers should find this a useful resource, if only for the comprehensive statistics and ammunition rules."

References

Cyberpunk (role-playing game) supplements
Role-playing game supplements introduced in 1994